Jeeragiwad is a village in Dharwad district of Karnataka, India.

Demographics 
As of the 2011 Census of India there were 214 households in Jeeragiwad and a total population of 923 consisting of 479 males and 444 females. There were 125 children ages 0-6.

References

Villages in Dharwad district